Mackenzie 'Mac' Brian Wilcox (born 7 August 1996) is a field hockey player from New Zealand, who plays as a forward.

Personal life
Mackenzie Wilcox was born and raised in Tolaga Bay, New Zealand.

Career

Domestic competitions

Ford NHL
Mackenzie Wilcox was a member of the Central Mavericks in the Ford National Hockey League (NHL), representing the team from 2015 to 2019. During his time with the team, Wilcox won a bronze medal in the 2016 edition of the tournament.

Premier Hockey League
Following the overhaul of the NHL and subsequent introduction of the Premier Hockey League, Wilcox was named in the Central Falcons. The league's inaugural edition was held in 2020, with the team taking home a gold medal.

National teams

Under–21
Wilcox debuted for the New Zealand U–21 team in 2016 at the Junior Oceania Cup. Following this, he appeared at the Sultan of Johor Cup in Johor Bahru, followed by the FIH Junior World Cup in Lucknow.

Black Sticks
In 2017, Wilcox debuted for the Black Sticks during a test series against Pakistan in Wellington. Following his debut, he went on to win a silver medal at the Oceania Cup in Sydney.

Following a major hip surgery, Wilcox was forced to miss a year of hockey during his recovery.

Wilcox was also a member of the Black Sticks in the inaugural season of the FIH Pro League.

International goals

References

External links
 
 

1996 births
Living people
Male field hockey forwards
Sportspeople from the Gisborne District
New Zealand male field hockey players